The Battle of Lingones was fought in 298 between the Western Roman Empire and the Alamanni. The Roman force was led by Constantius Chlorus, and was victorious.

The battle 
Few of the battles of that age, in the 130-year gap between the period recorded by Dio Cassius and Ammianus Marcellinus, are in any degree adequately recorded. From what little is known, it seems that  Constantius Chlorus, Caesar of Gaul, was travelling in the open champagne country near Lingones, (modern-day Langres in the Haute-Marne department of France), with a small escort, when he was attacked by a barbarian army which had unexpectedly crossed the Rhine. The heavily outnumbered Caesar was worsted in a sharp skirmish from which he barely escaped, apparently receiving a wound. He took shelter in Langres, where the enemy surrounded the remnants of his broken force. So hard on his heels was the barbarian pursuit, that the wounded Caesar was reportedly hauled up the walls by rope, the garrison refusing to open the gates in the presence of so dangerous an enemy. However, the garrisons of the surrounding cities quickly united to relieve the distressed city and emperor; the besieging camp was surprised and overrun, and 6,000 Alemans fell in the massacre.

References

Lingones
Lingones
Lingones
Lingones
History of Haute-Marne
298
290s in the Roman Empire
3rd century in Roman Gaul